HMS Seal was a B-class torpedo boat destroyer of the British Royal Navy. She was completed by Laird, Son & Company, Birkenhead, in 1897.

Design and construction
Seal was ordered on 9 January 1896 as the fifth of six 30-knotter destroyers programmed to be built by Lairds under the 1895–1896 programme. These followed on from four very similar destroyers ordered from Lairds as part of the 1894–1895 programme.

Displacement was  light and  full load.

Armament was the standard for the 30-knotters, i.e. a QF 12 pounder 12 cwt ( calibre) gun on a platform on the ship's conning tower (in practice the platform was also used as the ship's bridge), with a secondary armament of five 6-pounder guns, and two 18-inch (450 mm) torpedo tubes.

Seal was laid down on 17 June 1896 as yard number 625 and was launched on 6 March 1897. Seal commissioned in May 1898.

Service
Lieutenant Arthur John Payne was appointed in command in September 1899, and she was commissioned as part of the Devonport Destroyer Instructional Flotilla. In February 1900 she was slightly damaged while in the Falmouth harbour when the destroyer  dragged her moorings and drifted into several of the other ships of the flotilla. Lieutenant Victor Gallafent Gurner was appointed in command on 1 March 1900. She underwent repairs to re-tube her boilers during Spring 1902, and Lieutenant Harry Charles John Roberts West was appointed in command from 2 September, when she did commission at Devonport for the Mediterranean station.

In January 1907 Seal was part of the Second Destroyer Flotilla and was under repair at Chatham Dockyard.

On 30 August 1912 the Admiralty directed all destroyers were to be grouped into classes designated by letters based on contract speed and appearance. As a four-funneled 30-knotter destroyer, Seal was assigned to the B class. In 1912, older destroyers were organised into Patrol Flotillas, with Seal being part of the 7th Flotilla, based at Devonport, in March 1913.  Seal remained part of the 7th Flotilla on the eve of the First World War in July 1914.

At the outbreak of war, the 7th Flotilla was redeployed to the Humber River for operations off the East coast of Britain. Duties of the Flotilla were to prevent enemy ships from carrying out minelaying or torpedo attacks in the approaches to ports on the East coast, and to prevent raids by enemy ships.

References

Bibliography

 
 
 
 
 
 
 
 
 

 

Earnest-class destroyers
Ships built on the River Mersey
1897 ships
B-class destroyers (1913)
World War I destroyers of the United Kingdom